The Purisima Hills are a northwest-to-southeast trending low mountain range of the Outer Southern California Coast Ranges, located in Santa Barbara County, California.  They divide the Santa Ynez Valley on the south from the Los Alamos Valley on the north.

They are the location of the economically important Lompoc Oil Field.

The Purisima Hills are the southernmost location in the current natural range of the coast Douglas-Fir (Pseudotsuga menziesii var. menziesii).

References

California Coast Ranges
Mountain ranges of Santa Barbara County, California